The Sadozai Sultanate of Herat was a state in Herat founded in 1716 when Abdali Afghans expelled Safavid forces from the province. They were conquered in 1732 by the Afsharids.

References 

History of Herat
Pashtun dynasties
1732 disestablishments
1716 establishments